The Musketeers of Pig Alley is a 1912 American short drama and a gangster film. It is directed by D. W. Griffith and written by Griffith and Anita Loos. It is also credited for its early use of follow focus, a fundamental tool in cinematography.

The film was released on October 31, 1912 and re-released on November 5, 1915 in the United States. The film was shot in Fort Lee, New Jersey where many other early film studios in America's first motion picture industry were based at the beginning of the 20th century. Location shots in New York City reportedly used actual street gang members as extras during the film.

It was also shown in Leeds Film Festival in November 2008, as part of Back to the Electric Palace, with live music by Gabriel Prokofiev, performed in partnership with Opera North.

In 2016, the film was added to the United States National Film Registry by the Library of Congress as being "culturally, historically, or aesthetically significant".

Plot
The film is about a poor married couple living in New York City. The husband works as a musician and must often travel for work. When returning, his wallet is taken by a gangster. His wife goes to a ball where a man tries to drug her, but his attempt is stopped by the same man who robbed the husband. The two criminals become rivals, and a shootout ensues. The husband gets caught in the shootout and recognizes one of the men as the gangster who took his money. The husband sneaks his wallet back and the gangster goes to safety in the couple's apartment. Policemen track the gangster down but the wife gives him a false alibi.

Cast
 Elmer Booth – Snapper Kid, Musketeers gang leader
 Lillian Gish – The Little Lady
 Clara T. Bracy – The Little Lady's Mother
 Walter Miller – The Musician
 Alfred Paget – Rival Gang Leader
 John T. Dillon – Policeman
 Madge Kirby – The Little Lady's Friend / In Alley
 Harry Carey –  Snapper's Sidekick
 Robert Harron – Rival Gang Member / In Alley / At Gangster's Ball
 W. C. Robinson – Rival Gang Member (as Spike Robinson)
 Adolph Lestina – The Bartender / On Street
 Jack Pickford – Boy Gang Member / At Dance Ball
Uncredited:
Gertrude Bambrick – Girl at Dance 
Lionel Barrymore – The Musician's Friend 
Kathleen Butler – On Street / At Dance 
Christy Cabanne – At Dance 
Donald Crisp – Rival Gang Member 
Frank Evans – At Dance 
Dorothy Gish – Girl in Street 
Walter P. Lewis – In Alley / At Dance 
Antonio Moreno – Musketeers Gang Member / At Dance 
 Marie Newton	At Dance 
J. Waltham – In Alley

Influence
In his book The Movie Stars, film historian Richard Griffith wrote of the scene where Lillian Gish passes another woman on the street (pictured):

     

In fact, the girl is Dorothy Gish, Lillian's sister.

In the Cold Case episode Torn (Season 4.21) Lily sees the victim of a 1919 homicide in an homage to the scene of Lillian Gish passing another woman on the street (pictured).

See also
 Lionel Barrymore filmography
 Harry Carey filmography
 Lillian Gish filmography
 D. W. Griffith filmography

References

External links

The Musketeers of Pig Alley on YouTube
 
 

1912 films
American silent short films
American black-and-white films
1910s crime drama films
Films about organized crime in the United States
Films directed by D. W. Griffith
Films shot in Fort Lee, New Jersey
Films with screenplays by Anita Loos
Articles containing video clips
United States National Film Registry films
American crime drama films
1912 drama films
1910s American films
Silent American drama films